The 2009 Major League Lacrosse season was the ninth season of the league.  The season began on May 15, 2009 and concluded with the championship game on August 23, 2009.

Milestones & events

Rule changes
Major League Lacrosse announced some major rule changes in the off-season.  The league will introduce a fourth long–stickman to play.  For the first eight seasons the league operated, each team could only field three long–stick defenders on the field at a time.  This rule was unique from the traditional men's field lacrosse rules played in high schools and colleges.  The league will maintain the two–point goal and shot clock that differentiates Major League Lacrosse rules from high school and college lacrosse.  In addition, the league announced that each team would be permitted to have one additional roster position to a total of nineteen players.

Team movement
The Washington Bayhawks will move from the Washington D.C. area to Annapolis, Maryland.  The Bayhawks have signed a three–year contract with the Naval Academy to play their home games at the Navy–Marine Corps Memorial Stadium. This move will be the Bayhawks sixth different home field in their nine years of existence.
The Long Island Lizards will move their home games back to James M. Shuart Stadium, where they played in 2001 and 2002.
The MLL announced on February 19 that the Los Angeles Riptide, Philadelphia Barrage, New Jersey Pride, Rochester Rattlers and San Francisco Dragons folded and a new team will play in Toronto. The league will consist of 6 teams. The Eastern and Western Conferences have been eliminated.
 The Rochester Rattlers' roster and staff will be transferred to the new Toronto Nationals team; however, the name, colors, and history are staying behind in Rochester to be potentially used by a future MLL team.
 For their home games, The Toronto Nationals played their inaugural season at BMO Field.

Pre-season

Casey, Ryan, and Mikey Powell, three of the best and most popular players in the league, all sat out for the 2009 season. The three brothers did not report to their respective teams as of the April 1 contract deadline - which means they are ineligible to play for anyone for the remainder of 2009. This was not the first time the Powell brothers sat out a season. The 2009 season was Mikey's third sitting out, while it is Casey's second, and Ryan's first.

Standings 
W = Wins, L = Losses, PCT = Winning Percentage, GB = Games Back of first place, GF = Goals For, 2ptGF = 2 point Goals For, GA = Goals Against, 2ptGA = 2 point Goals Against

Final

Long Island finished ahead of Boston base on head-to-head record 3-0.

All Star Game 
The 2009 game took place July 16 at Denver's INVESCO Field. The Old School beat the Young Guns 22-21 in overtime.  Brian Langtry (Denver) was named the MVP for the game.

Playoffs
The 2009 New Balance MLL Championship Weekend took place on Saturday and Sunday, August 22 and 23 at Navy–Marine Corps Memorial Stadium in Annapolis, Maryland. The two semifinal games were at 12 PM ET and 3 PM ET on Saturday. The Toronto Nationals and Denver Outlaws won their semi-final matchups and in the Championship game with 45 seconds left, Shawn Williams scored to give the Nationals a 10-9 lead and Toronto won the MLL championship. 

Merrick Thomson was named MVP for the playoffs

Awards

Annual awards

References 

9
Major League Lacrosse